El libro de recuerdos is a repackaging of the albums "Matter Has A Breaking Point" & "Missing You Dearly" by indie rock band Twothirtyeight.

Track listing
 "Just Dropping (A Line)"
 "To The Concerned"
 "A Beautiful Disease"
 "This Is Why I Wait"
 "Suitcases for Always"
 "Tales From Your Nightstand"
 "You Made A Way for Moses"
 "Far From Comfort"
 "I'll Never Do That"
 "Colorblind"
 "Number Four"
 "Kevin"
 "Stripped of All"
 "Chase What Makes Your Heart Flutter"
 "Subtle Sacrifice"
 "Trials"

Twothirtyeight albums
2003 compilation albums
Tooth & Nail Records compilation albums